Musou or Musō may refer to:

 The Japanese name for the Koei Tecmo Warriors franchise
 Musou gauge, used in the Samurai Warriors series of video games
 Musou mode, used in the Dynasty Warriors series of video games

 Muso (InuYasha), a minor character from InuYasha

People with the surname Musō include:
 Musō Soseki (1275–1351), Japanese Zen master
 Musō Gonnosuke, early 17th-century samurai

See also